Deceivers is the eleventh studio album by Swedish melodic death metal band Arch Enemy. Originally scheduled for a 29 July 2022 release, the album was pushed back to 12 August 2022 for undisclosed reasons. Deceivers is Arch Enemy's first studio album since 2017's Will to Power, marking the longest gap between two of their studio albums.

Background and recording 
Writing began as early as October 2018: main songwriter and guitarist Michael Amott mentioned on an interview with Loudwire that he had "a few new ideas already for new stuff". In February 2021, on "The Riffhard Podcast", lead guitarist  Jeff Loomis revealed he was "doing solos for the new Arch Enemy album", though adding he did not know when it would be released.

All of the album was recorded in Europe, except for Loomis' guitar contributions: due to traveling restrictions, he was unable to join the rest of the band, so they ended up "having him do his solos in the studio in Seattle".

The song “Spreading Black Wings” is dedicated to the memory of LG Petrov.

Promotion 
"Deceiver, Deceiver" and "House of Mirrors", respectively released on 21 October 2021 and 9 December 2021, were the first two singles from the album, each receiving a music video: however, at that time, the album had not been yet announced, and both tracks were simply marketed as standalone singles.

The album was officially announced on 27 January 2022; the third single "Handshake with Hell" was released eight days later on 4 February 2022, along with its accompanying music video.

On 20 May 2022, the fourth single "Sunset over the Empire" was released alongside a video clip. A 7-inch vinyl single featuring the single alongside "The Judging Eyes", an instrumental remake of War Eternal's "You Will Know My Name" , was commercialized in limited edition.

The band announced that the record was postponed by two weeks on 6 June 2022, the reason being "unforeseen circumstances". No further information was issued about the topic.

"In the Eye of the Storm", the fifth and last single, was released on 14 July 2022 with its music video.

Reception

Track listing

Personnel

Arch Enemy 
 Alissa White-Gluz – vocals
 Michael Amott – rhythm guitar, lead guitar, co-production
 Jeff Loomis – lead guitar
 Sharlee D'Angelo – bass guitar
 Daniel Erlandsson – drums, keyboards, sound effects, co-production, engineering

Additional musician 
 Raphael Liebermann – cello

Technical personnel 
 Jacob Hansen – production, engineering , mixing, mastering
 Aaron Smith – recording 
 Ruben Kamlah – recording 
 Alex Reisfar – cover art
 CVSPE (André Trindade) – artwork 
 Costin Chioreanu – layout
 Patric Ullaeus – photography

Charts

References 

2022 albums
Arch Enemy albums
Century Media Records albums